Edward II is a 1991 British romantic historical drama film directed by Derek Jarman and starring Steven Waddington, Tilda Swinton and Andrew Tiernan. It is based on the play of the same name by Christopher Marlowe. The plot revolves around Edward II of England's infatuation with Piers Gaveston, which proves to be the downfall of both of them, thanks to the machinations of Roger Mortimer.

The film is staged in a postmodern style, using a mixture of contemporary and medieval props, sets and clothing. (The date "1991" appears on a royal proclamation at one point.) The gay content of the play is also brought to the fore by Jarman, notably by adding a homosexual sex scene and by depicting Edward's army as gay rights protesters.

Plot
Once installed as king, following the death of his father, Edward II summons his friend and lover, Piers Gaveston, back to England from exile abroad, and showers him with gifts, titles and abiding love. Their relationship is fiery and passionate, but it is the focus of gossip and derision throughout the kingdom. Upon his return, Gaveston takes revenge on the Bishop of Winchester, who had been responsible for his banishment from England during the previous reign, by personally torturing him. Kent, Edward's brother, is the first to protest about Gaveston's return. Many others feel the same way, including the Bishop of Winchester and Lord Mortimer, who is in charge of the kingdom's military forces. Nevertheless, Edward defends his lover from his mounting enemies.

A pleasure-seeker, Edward is quite distracted from affairs of state, much to the distress and anger of the court (sombre men and women in business suits). Queen Isabella, Edward's French wife, vainly tries everything to win him back from his lover, but she is mercilessly rejected by her husband. Love-starved, Isabella turns to Gaveston, who inflames her desire by whispering obscenities in her ear, and then mocks her responsiveness.

The handsome, hedonistic and opportunistic Gaveston repels everyone except the King. His enemies join forces and threaten Edward with dethronement and exile; Edward is forced to comply with their wishes and sends Gaveston away. The lovers' separation is serenaded by Annie Lennox’s rendition of Cole Porter's "Ev'ry Time We Say Goodbye".

The queen hopes that once Gaveston is away she could reconcile with her husband, but he rejects her once again. In a last effort to regain her husband's affection, she allows Gaveston to return. The king and his lover resume their relationship, but their enemies are ready to strike back.

Isabella and Mortimer, who has become her lover, plan to rule the realm through Edward and Isabella's young son, the future Edward III. When Kent tries to save his brother, he is murdered by Isabella. The nobles are soon plotting to get rid not only of Gaveston but also the king. Mortimer, their leader, is a military man and practising sadomasochist who takes a grim pleasure in personally torturing Gaveston and the lovers' friend Spencer, who he addresses as "girl boy." Their torture takes place while there is a clash between the police and members of the British gay rights organisation Outrage.

After Gaveston and Spencer's assassinations, Edward, who has been thrown in a dungeon, is executed by impalement on a red-hot poker. This hideous fate is presented as a nightmare from which the imprisoned king awakens. The executioner, when he does arrive, tosses away his lethal weapon and kisses the man he was sent to kill.

Back in the castle, Mortimer and Isabella enjoy their triumph just briefly. The king's young son, Edward III, who all along has been neglected by both parents and who has witnessed their quarrels, has donned his mother's earrings and lipstick and, while listening to classical music on his Walkman, walks atop a cage that imprisons his mother and Mortimer.

Cast
 Steven Waddington as Edward II
 Tilda Swinton as Isabella
 Andrew Tiernan as Piers Gaveston
 Nigel Terry as Mortimer
 John Lynch as Spencer
 Dudley Sutton as Bishop of Winchester
 Jerome Flynn as Kent
 Jody Graber as Prince Edward
 Annie Lennox as The Singer

Reception
The film received positive reviews from critics. It currently holds a 100% "Certified Fresh" score on the review-aggregator site Rotten Tomatoes. Rolling Stone called it "a piercing cry from the heart" and The Washington Post praised Jarman for "keeping the story streamlined and potently clear while retaining Marlowe's poetic period language". The Observer called it one of "Derek Jarman's most accomplished films". The film has been considered a classic example of New Queer Cinema.

Jarman's use of anachronism caught the attention of many critics. The Guardian mentions that "historical and modern" timelines intersect in the costuming, the portrayal of Edward II's army, and the soundtrack. The latter is perhaps the most startling of the anachronisms in the film as it is mentioned in several articles yet never critiqued. The New York Times writes, “One of the oddest touches is the out-of-the-blue appearance of the singer Annie Lennox wistfully crooning Cole Porter's "Ev'ry Time We Say Goodbye"”. Cole Porter was closeted for reasons that can be paralleled to Edward II's queer lifestyle, as “public knowledge of his sexuality, Porter feared, could compromise his success". Similarly to Edward II, and "like many gay public figures, Porter married a woman for convenience”. The LA Times reflects that Porter "was aware that if you disclosed too much in Hollywood, you were likely to lose your job-- and your audience". However, Porter and Edward II differ as Porter remained closeted and Edward II (as summarized) was willing to risk his status to be with his lover, Gaveston. Jarman's choice of artist, Annie Lennox, to sing Porter's song is anachronistic in and of itself; the film provides a structure in which two different points in time intersect, 1944 and 1991, represented by someone who fears queerness and then by someone who advocates for the rights of the LGBT community. In fact, Lennox sang the song for the "film Edward II after recording it for the Red Hot + Blue AIDS awareness tribute album to Cole Porter”. Regardless of reasons why Porter and Lennox were included in the film, it was recognized in a positive light. The Washington Post wrote that Jarman's "decision to have Annie Lennox serenade the departing Gaveston and his lover with a rendition of Cole Porter's "Every Time We Say Goodbye" is a brilliant stroke; it's Marlowe meets MTV".

References

External links

1991 films
1991 LGBT-related films
1990s historical films
1991 romantic drama films
British drama films
British historical films
British LGBT-related films
British romantic drama films
British films based on plays
Films about death
Films directed by Derek Jarman
Gay-related films
1990s avant-garde and experimental films
British avant-garde and experimental films
British historical romance films
Adaptations of works by Christopher Marlowe
Cultural depictions of Edward II of England
1990s English-language films
1990s British films